BRP-PACU is a dual channel FFT audio analysis tool.  It is designed to be used with an omnidirectional calibrated microphone to configure any sound system with an appropriate equalization and delay.  It compares the output of the system to the input of the system to obtain the transfer function of the system.  These data allow one to perform final equalization using just the input/output of the DSP or any other device used for Equalization.

Theoretical basis 
This software program uses a Transfer Function Measurement method to compare the output of a (unprocessed) loud-speaker system and room combination to the input signal which is usually filtered pseudorandom noise.  Because the sound has a propagation time from the exit point of the transducer to the measurement device, a delay must be inserted in the reference signal to compensate.  This delay is automatically found by the software to aid in practical system measurement.

Supported platforms 
Currently the only supported platforms are Linux and Mac OS X  because it relies on POSIX Threads.  It also is written using floating point processing, making most embedded Linux device support difficult.

Features 
 Four capture buffers, with auto-save (in case of crash) and save-as ability
 Averages buffers to a separate buffer and flips it for analysis
 Automatic delay calculation
 Impulse response capturing
 Uses JACK to route and manage audio paths
 Pink noise generation tool to eliminate need for an external pink noise source

Licensing and availability 
The software is licensed under the GPL-2.0-or-later.  It is available from SourceForge as C code.

Future development 
 Ubuntu and Debian packages
 A Virtual Machine for usage under other Operating Systems such as Microsoft Windows
 The ability to create and load User Interface options
 Phase response for transfer function

References

External links 
 

Free science software
Free audio software
Free software programmed in C
Audio software with JACK support